The John H. Jackson Moot Court Competition. is an international moot court competition on WTO law. The competition takes place on a yearly basis, with its first edition dating back to 2002. The competition was formerly known as ELSA Moot Court Competition on WTO but has been renamed in 2018 after the American professor of law John Howard Jackson.

The competition is structured into six regional rounds all over the world and a final oral round where around 25 selected teams take part in. Each edition of the moot court hosts around one hundred teams constituted of two to four law students.

The Competition simulates a hearing of the WTO dispute settlement system. Teams prepare and analyse a fictitious case created by specialists of WTO Law and present their arguments for both the Complainant and the Respondent, first in a written format and then in front of a Panel which consists of WTO and trade law experts.

The competition is organised by the European Law Students' Association (ELSA) and is technically supported by the World Trade Organization. It gathers participants from around 40 countries and 80 universities every year. The 18th and the 19th editions of the Competition where mainly organised online. 

Since 2020, Pascal Lamy, former Director General of the WTO, is the Patron of the Competition.

The competition

Organisers 
The Competition is organized by the international board of the European Law Students’ Association (ELSA). The European Law Students’ Association (ELSA) is an international, independent, non-political, non-profit making organisation for students and recent graduates in the field of Law. ELSA organises international project, amongst which the John H. Jackson Moot Court Competition.

The administrative planning of the Competition, the coordination of the Regional Rounds, and the organisation of the Final Oral Round is carried out by ELSA and the regional rounds of the competition are organized by selected hosts (universities, entities, firms)

Sponsors and supporters 

The John H. Jackson Moot Court Competition is supported by multiple historical sponsors, in addition to the technical support of the World Trade Organization. They are providing financial and academic support to the organisation. 

Van Bael & Bellis is the main sponsor of the John H. Jackson Moot Court Competition. Baker McKenzie, Akin Gump and Steptoe are the gold sponsors of the Competition and Sidley Austin and White and Case are the silver sponsors of the Competition.

Georgetown Law is the main academic supporter of the John H. Jackson Moot Court Competition and the World Trade Institute (WTI) and the European Public Law Organization (EPLO) are the academic supporters of the Competition

Awards 
During the Regional Rounds as well as during the Final Oral Round of the Competition, some teams and some participants are Awarded. The sponsors and supporters of the Competition are providing prizes for some of the Awards during the Competition.

The awards are:

 Best Complainant Written Submission Awards, for the Complainant, the Respondent and Overall;

 Best Orator Awards, for the Preliminaries, the Quarter-Finals, the Semi-Finals and the Final;

 Runner up of the round;
 Winner of the round.

Structure of the competition

1. The Written Round 
On the 15th of September, the new edition is launched and the Case if published. The teams taking part in the competition have then between four and five months to draft two written submissions of 35 pages maximum each, one for each side of the dispute (Complainant and Respondent).

This round is not eliminatory, and all the teams submitting the written submissions will take part in the Regional Rounds. There the scores of the written submissions will be added to the scores they will receive in their pleading.

2. The Regional Rounds 
All the teams that submitted a Written Submission will proceed to one of the 6 Regional Oral Rounds, depending on their location, from February to May of the second semester of the Edition. They will then plead against each other in sessions of 2 hours 30, at least two times.

Six rounds, as follow, are taking place in a new location every ear, hosted by Institution, chapters of ELSA or ALSA or Universities:

 First and Second European Regional Rounds (including all the countries where an ELSA group is present);
 East Asia & Oceania Regional Round;
 West & South Asia Regional Round;
 All American Regional Round;
 African Regional Round.

They will first plead for the Complainant and the Respondent side in the preliminary sessions, then the four selected teams will plead during the Semi-Finals of the regional round and the winning teams of the Semi-Finals are taking part in the Final of the Round, open to public.

3. Final Oral Round 
The 25 selected teams of the Regional Rounds gather in Geneva, at the WTO Headquarters and at the Graduate Institute, where the Final Oral Round of the competition takes place at the end of June.

The Final Oral Round is structured in the same way as the regional rounds.

Overview of the previous editions

Winners of the previous editions

Cases of the previous editions

References 

Debating
Law